Vernon Edward Hartley Booth (born 17 July 1946) is a former British politician.

Political career
Having stood unsuccessfully for Hackney North and Stoke Newington in 1983, Booth succeeded Margaret Thatcher as the Conservative Member of Parliament for Finchley from the 1992 general election until the constituency was abolished in the 1997 general election.

Booth resigned in February 1994 as a parliamentary private secretary to Douglas Hogg, then the Foreign Office minister of state, after newspaper reports of a relationship with House of Commons researcher Emily Barr. Despite his resignation, Booth insists that "there was no sexual impropriety" between himself and Barr. This was politically embarrassing to the John Major government of the time, following the backlash of Major's Back to Basics initiative, and in January 2015, the satirical magazine Private Eye criticised Booth for his alleged hypocrisy, saying it went against his recommendations in the newly released 1985 memo that the government should instil values of "personal responsibility, basic honesty, [and respect for] the law and the police" from an early age. Barr went on to be a successful journalist and novelist.

Booth lost a bruising nomination battle with the Hendon South MP John Marshall for the new Finchley and Golders Green constituency, and was unsuccessful in finding another seat before the election. Marshall lost the 1997 general election to Labour's Rudi Vis.

Booth was a co-author of a 1985 memo by former Number 10 adviser Oliver Letwin, advising that the then-Prime Minister Margaret Thatcher ought not to regenerate certain inner cities, claiming that black youths would use the money for the "discotheque and drug trade", and added: "So long as these bad moral attitudes remain, efforts to improve the inner cities will flounder." However, Booth has "largely escaped notice" with regards to co-authoring the memo.

Personal life
A Methodist lay preacher with a wife and three children, Booth is related to the founders of the Salvation Army.

References

Conservative Party (UK) MPs for English constituencies
UK MPs 1992–1997
1946 births
Living people